Tangram is a dissection puzzle.

Tangram may also refer to:

Tangram, Nepal, a village in Nepal
Tangram (album), a 1980 album by Tangerine Dream